Apospasta is a genus of moths of the family Noctuidae.

Species
 Apospasta aethalopa D. S. Fletcher, 1961
 Apospasta albirenalis (Laporte, 1974)
 Apospasta ancillottoi Berio, 1978
 Apospasta cailloisi Laporte, 1984
 Apospasta claudicans (Guenée, 1852)
 Apospasta deprivata (Prout, 1927)
 Apospasta diffusa (Laporte, 1974)
 Apospasta dipterigidia (Hampson, 1902)
 Apospasta erici Laporte, 1984
 Apospasta eriopygioides (Aurivillius, 1910)
 Apospasta fuscirufa (Hampson, 1905)
 Apospasta incongrua (Laporte, 1974)
 Apospasta intricata (Saalmüller, 1891)
 Apospasta iodea (Rothschild, 1920)
 Apospasta jacksoni D. S. Fletcher, 1961
 Apospasta kennedyi D. S. Fletcher, 1961
 Apospasta luminosa (Wileman & South, 1920)
 Apospasta maryamae Laporte, 1984
 Apospasta montana (Aurivillius, 1910)
 Apospasta niger Laporte, 1984
 Apospasta nigerrima (Laporte, 1973)
 Apospasta nyei (Holloway, 1976)
 Apospasta pannosa (Moore, 1881)
 Apospasta rantaizanensis (Wileman, 1915)
 Apospasta rhodina D. S. Fletcher, 1961
 Apospasta rougeoti (Laporte, 1974)
 Apospasta rubiana (Guenée, 1862)
 Apospasta ruffoi Berio, 1978
 Apospasta sabulosa D. S. Fletcher, 1959
 Apospasta sikkima (Moore, 1882)
 Apospasta stigma (Joicey & Talbot, 1915)
 Apospasta synclera D. S. Fletcher, 1961
 Apospasta townsendi D. S. Fletcher, 1961
 Apospasta venata (Hampson, 1905)
 Apospasta verini (Viette, 1981)

References

Hadeninae